Ngau Hom is a village in Lau Fau Shan, Yuen Long District, New Territories, Hong Kong.

Administration
Ngau Hom is a recognized village under the New Territories Small House Policy.

References

External links
 Delineation of area of existing village Ngau Hom Tsuen (Ping Shan) for election of resident representative (2019 to 2022)

Villages in Yuen Long District, Hong Kong
Lau Fau Shan